The South West African 0-6-0T of 1911 was a steam locomotive from the German South West Africa era.

In 1911, the Lüderitzbucht Eisenbahn (Lüderitzbucht Railway) in German South West Africa placed two  locomotives in service as shunting engines. They were apparently no longer in service when all railways in the territory came under the administration of the South African Railways in 1922.

Manufacturer
During 1911, two Cape Gauge  locomotives were delivered to the Lüderitzbucht Eisenbahn by Orenstein & Koppel. The locomotives, with works numbers 4256 and 4257, were supplied in January 1911 to the order of Consortium Bachstein-Koppel. They were numbered 201 and 202 and were placed in service as shunting engines.

Characteristics
It had coupled wheels of  diameter and cylinders of  bore and  stroke.

Service
The two engines were placed in shunting service in Lüderitz. It is not known whether they survived the First World War and they do not appear to have still been in service on 1 April 1922, when all railways in the former German colony came under the administration of the South African Railways.

References

0870
C locomotives
0-6-0T locomotives
Orenstein & Koppel locomotives
Cape gauge railway locomotives
Railway locomotives introduced in 1911